Bethungra may refer to:
Bethungra, New South Wales, a locality in rural New South Wales
Bethungra Spiral, the railway spiral near the locality
Bethungra, Canterbury, a house in the suburb of Canterbury, Sydney in New South Wales

Disambiguation pages